The following have served as presidents of the Senate of Saint Lucia.

See also
Senate of Saint Lucia

References

Politics of Saint Lucia
Saint Lucia